Ogbomosho (also Ògbómọ̀ṣọ́) is a city in Oyo State, south-western Nigeria. It was founded in the mid 17th century. The population was approximately 454,690 in the 2006 census. It is the second largest city in Oyo State and also among the most populated in Nigeria. Although the principal inhabitants of the city are the Yoruba people, there are people from other parts of Nigeria and other West African countries who are resident in the city.

History
According to an early missionary, "Ogbomosho in 1891 was a walled city, the gates of which were closely watched by day and securely closed by night. The town, picturesque and well watered was isolated from the rest of the Yoruba towns. Political relations were maintained with the Ibadans, for the country depended on its security on the warriors of Ogbomosho and Ikirun... The strength of Ogbomosho lay in the wall and moat surrounding the town, and the warriors made full use of it by sitting close and tight.."

The tale behind the name Ogbomoso

Olabanjo Ogunlola Ogundiran was of Ibariba descent.  He and his wife, Esuu, built their hut by the side of the ajagbon tree.

Ogunlola (later Soun) noticed smoke oozing from some nearby locations. He took courage and approached these places and discovered other hunters. There is no more Bale Akande.

Egbe Alongo (Alongo Society)

Ogunlola, after the discovery of these hunters, took the initiative to invite them to form the Alongo Society. The primary objectives of the society were:
defence against Sunmoni (slave prowlers) raids
group hunting of wild animals, and
mutual assistance.
After each day's hunting, they retired to Ogunlola's hut where they were treated to beans and other meals and were served with Sekete wine brewed by Ogunlola's wife from fermented guinea corn. They also engaged in discussing current affairs and planning.

Orisapopo

Esuu, the wife of Ogunlola, introduced the worship of Orisapopo to Ogbomoso. The worshippers were distinguished by white beads worn round their necks and wearing of white dresses only. Drinking of palm wine was forbidden to them. The name Orisapopo was probably derived from the fact that Ogunlola's hut was on the northsouthern route, therefore the Orisala being worshipped in the hut was named “Orisapopo” (idol by the highway).
The importance and influence of ‘Orisapopo’ among the citizens of Ogbomoso is immense. It can be described as the patron “Orisa” of Ogbomoso.

How Ogunlola's settlement became Ogbomosos and Ogunlola became Soun

During the time, the Ibaribas, under the leadership of Elemoso, attacked Oyo-Ile near Ilorin city.  Elemoso caused a devastating havoc among the Oyo people, so much that they feared him in battle. Elemoso consequently laid total siege on Oyo, causing famine and untold hardship among the people.

Alaafin was so impressed by Ogunlola's prowess that he, the Alaafin, requested Ogunlola to stay in the capital (Oyo-Ile) instead of returning to his settlement. Ogunlola politely declined saying “Ejeki a ma se ohun” meaning "let me stay yonder." His majesty, the Alaafin, granted Ogunlola's wish to return to his settlement. This was later contracted to Ogbomoso.

Eventually, the authority of Ogunlola became greater and more respected. His compound by the Ajagbon tree then became the Soun's palace and a rallying point for all Ogbomoso citizens.

Ogbomoso, because of her strategic location, quickly grew from a village status to a medium size town. Her people were also renown warriors. During the Fulani wars of the 19th century, many towns and villages (about 147) were deserted while their people took refuge in Ogbomoso. The influx of people further enhanced the size and strength of the town.

Alagba
Origin

Alagba is believed to have been born in the year 1675 in the old Oyo town, which is now being referred to as Ogbomoso. He was reputedly said to have been brought from the forest by the third Soun of Ogbomoso, Oba Ikumoyede who ruled from 1770 until 1797. In deference to its age, it is called Alagba, which means ”the elderly one” in Yoruba. In Ogbomoso, where the legendary tortoise lumbers about in the palatial grounds of the king, it is almost a sacrilege to refer to Alagba as a mere tortoise. The tortoise played host to many monarchs in Ogbomoso in the past.

Last days on earth

The sacred tortoise, which was believed to the oldest in Africa, was sick for a few days before her demise on 5 October 2019.

The palace household, Ogbomoso community and stakeholders in the tourism sector are reportedly mourning Alagba's passage because of the great impact left behind. Plans are underway to preserve Alagba's body for historical records.

List of monarchs
The founder of Ogbomoso, Soun Olabanjo Ogunlola Ogundiran, was the first Soun of Ogbomoso. He had 5 sons, Lakale, Kekere Esuo, Eiye and Jogioro. He was later succeeded by his youngest son, Erinbaba Alamu Jogioro, who was the second Soun. The 5 royal houses of Ogbomoso are descended from the 5 sons of Soun Ikomeyede, the third Soun of Ogbomoso (and son of Jogioro), Toyeje, Oluwusi, Baiyewu, Bolanta Adigun, and Ogunlabi Odunaro. The title of Soun was originally a Baale (minor chief) as Ogbomoso was a small village within the realm of the Oyo Empire. In 1952, the title was changed to Soun and they became recognized as a monarch.

 Soun Olabanjo Ogunlola Ogundiran (c.1659 - c.1714)
 Soun Erinsaba Alamu Jogioro (son of Ogunlola) (c.1741 - c.1770)
 Soun Ikumoyede Ajo (son of Jogioro) (c.1770 - c.1797)
Ologolo (a son of Jogioro) and Olukan (grandson of Lakale and great-grandson of Ogunlola) ruled during this period but were deposed by the Alaafin of Oyo 
 Soun Toyeje Akanni Alebiosu, the Aare Ona Kakanfo of Oyo (son of Ikumoyede) (c.1800 - c.1825)
 Soun Oluwusi Aremu (son of Ikumoyede) (c.1826 - c.1840)
 Soun Jayeola Bayewu Kelebe "Are Arolofin Alao" (son of Ikumoyede) (c.1840 - c.1842)
 Soun Idowu Bolanta Adigun (son of Ikumoyede) (c.1842 - c.1845)
 Soun Ogunlabi Odunaro (son of Ikumoyede) (c.1845 - c.1860) 
 Soun Ojo Olanipa "Aburumaku," the Aare Ona Kakanfo of Oyo (son of Toyeje) (c.1860 - September 1869)
 Soun Gbagungboye Ajamasa Ajagungbade I (son of Oluwusi) (1869 - c.1871)
 Soun Laoye Atanda Orumogege (son of Bayewu) (c.1871 - c.1901)
 Soun Majengbasan Elepo I (son of Bolanta) (1901 - 1907)
 Soun Adegoke Atanda Olayode I (son of Odunaro) (1908 - 1914; deposed by the Colonial Government)
 Soun Itabiyi Olanrewaju Ande (son of Aburumaku, grandson of Toyeje) (1914 - 1916)
 Soun Bello Afolabi Oyewumi Ajagungbade II (son of Ajagungbade I, grandson of Oluwusi) (1916 - February 18, 1940) 
 Soun Amao Oyetunde (son of Oyekola (never appointed), grandson of Laoye, and great-grandson of Bayewu) (1940 - June 12, 1944; deposed by the Colonial government, removed from some monarch lists); he was succeeded by his uncle
 Soun Lawani Oke Lanipekun (son of Laoye, grandson of Bayewu) (October 16, 1944 - March 19, 1952) 
 Oba Olatunji Alao Elepo II (son of Elepo I, grandson of Bolanta) (1952 - 1966) 
 Oba Emmanuel Olajide Olayode II (son of Olayode I, grandson of Odunaro) (July 22, 1966 - July 1, 1969; killed during the Agbekoya revolt
 Oba Salami Ajiboye Itabiyi II (son of Itabiyi, grandson of Aburumaku, great-grandson of Toyeje) (June 4, 1972 - June 2, 1973)
 Oba Jimoh Oyewunmi Ajagbungbade III (son of Ajagungbade II, grandson of Ajagungbade I, great-grandson of Oluwusi) (October 24, 1973 - December 12, 2021)
The current Soun, HM Jimoh Oyewunmi Ajagbungbade III of the Oluwusi Royal House was the longest reigning Soun in modern history, and died on December 12, 2021, at the age of 95.

Education
Ogbomosho has four degree-awarding institutions of higher learning. Ladoke Akintola University of Technology (LAUTECH) is named for the Ogbomosho son and Premier of the old Western Nigeria, Samuel Ladoke Akintola (SLA). LAUTECH is ranked at the top of the later generation universities in Nigeria. It awards degrees in science, engineering, technology and medicine. This university has a teaching hospital named Lautech Teaching Hospital.

The Nigerian Baptist Theological Seminary (NBTS), one of the oldest institutions of higher learning in Nigeria and the first to offers degree programs in theology, sociology and philosophy in Nigeria. The Seminary serves the Baptist Church in Nigeria, The Nigerian Baptist Convention (NBC), which also has its headquarters in Ibadan, Oyo State.

Bowen University Teaching Hospital Ogbomoso- (BUTH)  A Christian Teaching hospital training of doctors and other medical professionals. Originally established in March 1907 as a missionary medical facility and through the years developing into the Baptist Medical Centre and later transformed to a Teaching Hospital in 2009. BUTH now boasts of over 400 Bed Capacity, over 800 Staff and Students, Multidisciplinary Facility, Family Medicine Residency Programme, Nursing and Midwifery Courses, 50,000 Outpatients and 10,000 Inpatients, fully Accredited Training Programmes which includes; B.Sc. Anatomy, B.Sc. Physiology and MB/BS.

The city also hosts Best Legacy College of Education (affiliated with Al-Hikmah University, Ilorin) and Bethsaida College of Health Technology.

The Federal Government of Nigeria recently approved the establishment of Federal Polytechnic, Ayede, a satellite town of Ogbomosho. Learning and research activities will soon commence in this institution.

The federal government-owned Federal Government College, Ogbomosho and Nigerian Navy Secondary School, Ogbomosho are located in the city. There are numerous private secondary schools all over the city, some of which are Pine Valley High School, Faith Academy, Smith International Baptist Academy, Gomal Baptist College, George Green Baptist College, Zoe Schools, Maryland Catholic High School, Lautech International College, Zion Christian Academy, and Command Secondary School, Gambari.

Economy
Ogbomosho has about 257 surrounding villages and emerging towns which amalgamated to the rulership of Soun. The major economy in the land is Agriculture: Cashew plantations are widely distributed across the land, In addition, Mango plantations are widely distributed too. Ogbomosho is one time the largest planter of cassava across the globe. The people of the land also engages in trading, rearing of domestic animals like goats and sheep. Also, a very prominent veterinary hospital exist in Ogbomosho for vaccination of livestock. The people are widely traveled.

Other industries include trading, banking, small-scale manufacturing and constructions. There are two radio stations namely Parrot FM and Ajilete FM, and a television station, NTA Ogbomosho.

Inadequate government investment in infrastructural facilities and policy guidance for local initiatives have undermined economic growth and development of the town. The location of the town on terrain unattractive to manufacturers and investors, with the road network being poor.

Cityscape
Ogbomosho is connected by roads from major cities such as Ilorin, Osogbo, and Ibadan. One of the prominent landmarks is the central mosque at Oja-Igbo, which towers over the traditional walled compounds of private houses and the parts of the old wall that remain.

Other prominent landmarks are Ogbomosho Recreation Club, Ladoke Akintola University of Technology, Lautech's College of Health Sciences, Nigerian Baptist Theological Seminary, Bowen University Teaching Hospital, Lautech Teaching Hospital, Heroes Arcade and Soun Stadium.

Ogbomosho has other mosques, several churches, estates, and business complexes littered all over the city. Ogbomosho Recreation Club has meeting halls, an indoor sports hall and a golf course. The headquarters of the American Baptist Church of Nigeria and its theological seminary are located in the city. The closest airport to Ogbomosho is Ilorin Airport which is approximately 52 kilometers away.

Notable people 
 Chief Samuel Ladoke Akintola, a lawyer, politician, aristocrat and former Premier of the old western region. He was murdered during the Nigeria first coup of January 1966.
 Maj. Gen. Oladayo Popoola OFR. Former Military Governor, Oyo State . Former Military Governor, Ogun State . Chairman/CPO, Daybis Ltd.
 Christopher Adebayo Alao-Akala, Former executive governor of Oyo State.
 Col. Ibrahim Taiwo, former military governor of Kwara State
 Dayo Okeniyi, Hollywood Actor
 Alexander Abolore, Nigerian Artiste
 Lt. Col. Shittu Alao, former Air Force's Chief of the Air Staff.

References

External links

https://oyostate.gov.ng/about-oyo-state/
https://www.ogbomoso.net/

Bibliography
  (index, Ogbomosho: pp. 174-175)

 
Cities in Yorubaland
Cities in Nigeria